The Old Courthouse Museum – Natchitoches is a former courthouse is located at 600 Second Street Natchitoches, Louisiana.

The museum was formerly operated as a branch of Louisiana State Museum that displayed temporary exhibits of art and local history. It is no longer open to the public as a museum.

The second floor of the building houses the Natchitoches Genealogy Library, which includes historic maps, conveyances, mortgages and books, census records and other genealogical papers. The library is open to the public.

Courthouse architecture
The courthouse building, built in 1896, designed in the Richardsonian Romanesque style by the architectural firm of Favrot and Livaudais.  A brick clock tower rises above the building.

The brick courthouse is a historic district contributing property in the Natchitoches Historic District, of the Cane River National Heritage Area

See also
National Register of Historic Places listings in Natchitoches Parish, Louisiana

References

External links
 Natchitoches Genealogy Library - Visit Natchitoches

Courthouses in Louisiana
Defunct museums in Louisiana
Buildings and structures in Natchitoches, Louisiana
Museums in Natchitoches Parish, Louisiana
Louisiana State Museum
Cane River National Heritage Area
Historic district contributing properties in Louisiana
Buildings and structures completed in 1896
Historic American Buildings Survey in Louisiana
Richardsonian Romanesque architecture in Louisiana
National Register of Historic Places in Natchitoches Parish, Louisiana